Wang Lan (1922–2003) was a Taiwanese writer, artist and a National Assembly of the Republic of China deputy. He is famous for the novel Blue and Black, which is considered one of four major novels about anti-Japanese war.

See also
Taiwanese art

External links 
Wang Lan

Taiwanese male novelists
1922 births
2003 deaths
Taiwanese painters
Republic of China politicians from Tianjin
Politicians of Taiwan
Painters from Tianjin
Writers from Tianjin
20th-century Chinese painters
20th-century novelists
Chinese male novelists
Taiwanese people from Tianjin
20th-century Chinese male writers